Aziz Sa'ati,, born in Tehran in 1948, Sa'ati graduated from the School-of Television and Cinema with a specialty in cinematography and videography. After teaching courses on photography and laboratory work at the School, he began his professional career as a still photographer on the set of Bahram Beizai's THE CROW.
Sa'ati brought a new seriousness and artistic capability to the job of set photographer, and he is noted for upgrading the standards of that position. He worked as set photographer for many of Iran's best known directors. His set photographs have won many awards and been featured in major exhibitions.

Work

Sa'ati's work as a photographer, cinematographer, and director includes:

Still photographer
1976 - The Crow, The Night Never End.
1977 - Tall Shadows of the Wind, Samad Goes to the Town.
1979 - The Ballade of Tara.
1982 - Death of Yazdgerd, The Red Line.
1984 - Kamal-ol-molk. 1987 - Silk and Blade, The Peddler «award winner from 7th Fajr film festival», Mission, Hadji Washington, Shadow of Trist.
1988 - Payizan, Return of Jafar Khan, Maybe Some Other Time.
1989 - The Syclist «award winner from 8th Fajr film festival», Badlands.
1990 - Snake Fang, The Lost Time, Mother.
1991 - Shadow of Imagination, Banoo, Magic Jerney.
1992 - The Love-Stricken, Wolf's Trace.

Cinematographer
Short Films:
1992 - Images of Ghajar Dynasty (Mohsen Makhmalbaf), Stone and Glass (Mohsen Makhmalbaf), Conversation With Wind (Bahram Beyzaei).

Feature Films:
1991 - A Man A Bear (Masud Jafari Jozani), The Actor (Mohsen Makhmalbaf).
1992 - I Like the Earth (Abolhassan Davoudi), Hello I am Jojo! (Marziye Boroumand), Red-Cap and cousin (Iraj Tahmasb).
1993 - The Blue-Veiled (Rakhshan Banietemad).
1994 - Scent of Joseph's Shirt (Ebrahim Hatamikia), Minoo Watch Tower (Ebrahim Hatamikia).
1995 - The Blue Veiled (Rakhshān Banietemad)
1998 - Sunshine Man (Homayoun Asadian), The Glass Agency (Ebrahim Hatamikia).
1999 - Son of Mary (Hamid Jebelli).
2001 - Rey Passenger (Davoud Mirbagheri).
2002 - Red-cap and Sarvenaz (Iraj Tahmasb), The Pastrygirl (Iraj Tahmasb).
2006 - Under the Peach Tree (Iraj Tahmasb).

Director
Documentary Movie:
2006 - The Iranian Cinematographers
2007 - In Memory of Ali Hatami
2008 - Mohsen Badie, A Master Technician of the Cinema.

Other positions
  One of the founders of the Iranian Society of Still Photographers In Iranian Cinema and its presidency (1992)
  President of Iranian Society of Still photographers (1992)
  Member of the board of directors of Society of Cinematographers of Iranian Cinema (2000–2009)
  Member of establishing board of Film Museum of Iran (1995–2003)
  The jury member of the first photo exhibition of Iranian cinema (1993)
  The jury member of Promotional Material section of 13th Fajr Film Festival (1994)
  Member of selection board of Iranian films for 18th Fajr Film Festival (1998)
  Member of selection board of Iranian films for 19th Fajr Film Festival (1999)
  The jury member of Iranian films for Competition Selection 23th Fajr Film Festival (2003)
  President of Society Cinematographers of Iranian Cinema (2001–2003)
  Member of board of directors for Society of Cinematographers of Iranian Cinema (2003–2009)
  member of the High Council of Juries House of Cinema (2009)

Other activities
  Poster design for Iranian Cinema
  Art directing for movies
  Director assistant
  Publishing  collection of photos in Tehran Yearbook 2009
  photo exhibition "Old Porticos of Tehran" in Noghreh Center-1987
  photo exhibition "Tehran with Hatami" in Gallery No.6 - 2012
  photo exhibition "Tehran with Beyzaei" in Aria Gallery - 2013
  photo exhibition "Tehran with Kimyaei" in Golestan Gallery - 2013
  photo exhibition "History or Legend" in Aria Gallery - 2014

Awards
  Critiques Award of Film magazine for cinematography of the Actor (Mohsen Makhmalbaf)
  Critique Award of Donyaye Tasvir magazine for Glassy Agency (Ebrahim Hatamikia)
  Special Award for directing Cinematographers of Iranian Cinema from Cultural Department of Tehran Municipality

References
Aziz Saati Exhibitions Catalogs

1948 births
Living people
People from Tehran
Iranian cinematographers